Gund is a manufacturer of plush stuffed toys, one of the first manufactures of Teddy bears .

Gund or gunde may also refer to:

People
Agnes Gund, President Emerita of the Museum of Modern Art and member of the Board of Trustees of the National Council on the Arts
Gordon Gund, CEO of Gund Investment Corporation and the owner of various U.S. sports teams  
Graham Gund, president and founder of Gund Partnership, an architecture firm based in Cambridge, Massachusetts
Gunde Svan, a former Swedish cross country skier and auto racing driver

Other
Gund Institute for Ecological Economics, an environmental institute housed at the University of Vermont
Gund, the historical name of the Indian village of Kanihama

See also
Gundi (disambiguation)
Gundy (disambiguation)